Josh is a Bengali action romance film released on 30 July 2010, directed by Ravi Kinagi. It is a remake of Ravi Teja's Blockbuster Telugu film Bhadra released in 2005.

Plot
Indra (Jeet) and Rajib (Anshuman) are the thickest of friends studying in the same college. When Indra comes to the city to visit Rajib, Indra notices Rajib's sister, Anuradha (Srabanti Chatterjee), and is attracted to her instantly. When Rajib visits his home village, Indra visits along with him. Anu, who returns from Singapore, is impressed by Indra, who continually impresses her, based on her tastes. He gets along well with Rajib's and Anu's family, in the meanwhile convinces them that he would make a prospective groom for Anu.

Anu's family, mainly her brother and cousin, are involved in regional gangs in their village. When Anu takes out Indra to the temple for a visit, without the knowledge of their brother (Tapas Paul), Anu is then attacked by Rudra's brother Nikhil (Bharat Kaul) gets hold of Anu and threatens to kill Anu. In a swift action of bravery and skill, Indra knocks down Rudra's brother.

After this incident, Anu's brother, gives Indra a talk about why things are so violent in the village. He explains how he is a master's degree holder from a prestigious university (Pune) and how his wife is also a master's degree holder in integrated mathematics. Unfortunately, due to the nature of the villages, the rivalry is deadly and fatal. He ultimately says, even though the villages are violent, he will remain a noble person, with high ideals.

After a few days, though, in the most ungrateful manner and a show of cowardice, the rival gang fights with fierce brutality, and the rival gang leader Rudra (Puneet Issar) murders Rajib's entire family, except Anu. Indra makes the promise to Anu's brother that he will take up the responsibility of Anu and that he will eventually marry her. In the process, he also becomes a rival of Rudra as he kills his younger brother Nikhil to protect Anu.

After the tragedy, Indra and Anu head back to Kolkata city to attend Indra's sister's marriage. The movie shows the jovial aspects of the marriage ceremonies. At the end of the marriage, an uncle of Indra insults Anu and tells her to leave him and bribes her money to leave. Indra turned furious to his uncle and promised that he would marry Anu, whatever may come. Just as Anu and Indra go out to eat, the original rival gang of Rudra returns and Indra, in a fit of deep rage and anger, beats all the rival gang members, chases them down a few miles. Realizing he left Anu behind, he goes back to find she is gone and then instantly becomes deeply dejected and despondent. This is when his father asks him to tell him what happened. The story he tells his father is the story that is written above. The rest of the film deals with how Indra saves Anu and takes revenge from the goons.

Cast
 Jeet as Indra
 Srabanti Chatterjee as Anuradha
 Tapas Paul as Surya Narayan Chowdhury, Anu's elder brother, Agriculture Minister
 Haradhan Bandopadhyay as Indra's grandfather
 Laboni Sarkar as Surya Narayan Chowdhury's wife 
 Puneet Issar as Rudra, the main antagonist
 Angshuman Gupta as Rajib, Anu's elder brother
 Bharat Kaul as Nikhil, Rudra's younger brother
 Supriyo Dutta as Surya Narayan Chowdhury's henchman
 Joy Badlani  
 Sumit Ganguly
 Debaparna Chakraborty as Indra's sister

Soundtrack

References

5.^ "Film industry wants Mamata to focus right in revamp shot – Indian Express" http://archive.indianexpress.com/news/Film-industry-wants-Mamata-to-focus-right-in-revamp-shot/889518

External links

2010 films
2010s romantic action films
2010s Bengali-language films
Films scored by Rishi Chanda
Bengali-language Indian films
Bengali remakes of Telugu films
Indian romantic action films
2010 masala films